was a Japanese comedian and actor.

Career
Born in Hakodate, Hokkaido, Takase moved to Tokyo in 1905 and began acting in shinpa theater. He started to appear in films after 1915, including Teinosuke Kinugasa's avant-garde film A Page of Madness (1926). When Kinugasa joined Shochiku, Takase followed him and appeared in many films starring Chōjirō Hayashi, as well as in Kinugasa's Crossroads (1928). He moved to Nikkatsu in 1928, often playing villains, but changed to comedy after appearing in Mansaku Itami's Kokushi Musō (1932). Sadao Yamanaka used him in such a role in The Million Ryo Pot (1935). After moving to Toho in 1937, his comic persona involved appearing in strange clothes and spouting odd phrases.

Selected filmography

References

External links

1890 births
1947 deaths
People from Hakodate
20th-century Japanese male actors
Japanese male film actors
Japanese male silent film actors
Japanese comedians
20th-century comedians